Giuseppe Nicola Nasini (January 25, 1657– July 3, 1736) was an Italian painter of the Baroque period, active in Rome and Tuscany.

Biography
Born in Castel del Piano, now in the Province of Grosseto, Giuseppe was the son of the painter Francesco Nasini and was one of the Tuscan pupils in the Medici-patronized Grand-Ducal Academy for the Arts located in Rome and directed from 1673–86, by Ciro Ferri.

He was also sponsored in Rome by Agostino Chigi.  From 1679 to 1680, Nasini completed over a dozen portraits of Chigi's family; some are copies of paintings by Jacob Ferdinand Voet and Alessandro Mattia da Farnese.

On October 15, 1680, his paintings of the Judgement of Solomon and Elias meets a child and widow  was awarded second prize for design in the first class of painting at the Accademia di San Luca contest. In July 1681, he completed a St Peter of Alcantara for the church in the Villa Medicea L'Ambrogiana, near Montelupo Fiorentino

Nasini returned to Florence by 1685. During the reign of Cosimo III de' Medici, Nasini and Giuseppe Tonelli were commissioned to fresco an Allegory of the moral and religious virtues of the Medici for the ceiling of the gallery of the Uffizi that overlooks the river Arno.

In 1691, he completed frescoes for the Compagnia di San Luca (painter's guild) in the church of Carmine in Florence, and two ceilings in the Palazzo Medici-Riccardi depicting Jove unleashes thunderbolts and Hercules and Giants. He also frescoes for the Landi Chapel in the church of the Carmine. He painted a fresco of the Allegory of Reason (1694) for the palazzo Tolomei-Biffi in Florence.

In 1720, he returned to Rome, where he painted in the church of the Santi Apostoli, the Quirinal Palace, and one of the nave paintings in San Giovanni in Laterano. In Foligno, he painted a San Leonardo for the church of the Madonna del Pianto. For the Chapel of the Madonna inside the church of Santa Maria della Scala of Siena, he painted, along with his son Apollonio, a series of paintings consisting of large canvases portraying scenes from the life of the Virgin, including: the Birth of the Virgin, the Presentation in the Temple, and the Flight into Egypt, as well as frescoes depicting the Coronation of the Virgin and the Virgin crowned by the Trinity with angels upholding instruments of the Passion. Giuseppe's brother, Antonio Nasini and son Apollonio Nasini were also painters.

Appollonio and his father helped fresco the ceiling of the small oratory of San Gaetano di Thiene, Siena.

He died in Siena, aged 79.

References

’’Some Works by Florentine Cortoneschi: Gabbiani and Nasini’’, Bruce Davis. Burlington Magazine (1983) pages 685-6+688-9+693.
Santa Maria della Scala site.

External links

1657 births
1736 deaths
17th-century Italian painters
Italian male painters
18th-century Italian painters
Painters from Siena
Italian Baroque painters
Fresco painters
18th-century Italian male artists